There are currently about 46 providers of over-the-top media services (OTT) in India, which distribute streaming media over the Internet. In fiscal year 2018, the OTT market in India was worth  crore. The streaming market in India is predicted to be worth $15 billion by 2030, with $12.5 billion coming from the video market and $2.5 billion from audio. The OTT market in fiscal year 2020 was estimated to be worth $1.7 billion.

History and growth
The first dependent Indian OTT platform was BIGFlix, launched by Reliance Entertainment in 2008.
In 2010 Digivive launched India's first OTT mobile app called nexGTv, which provides access to both live TV and on–demand content. nexGTV is the first app to live–stream Indian Premier League matches on smart phones and did so during 2013 and 2014. The livestream of the IPL since 2015, when rights were won, played an important role in the growth of another OTT platform, Hotstar (now Disney+ Hotstar) in India.
OTT gained significant momentum in India when both DittoTV (Zee) and Sony Liv were launched in the Indian market around 2013. Ditto TV was an aggregator platform containing shows across all media channels including Star, Sony, Viacom, Zee, etc.

Hotstar 
Hotstar, (now Disney+ Hotstar), is the most subscribed–to OTT platform in India, owned by Star India as of July 2020, with around 300 million active users and over 350 million downloads. According to Hotstar's India Watch Report 2018, 96% of watch time on Hotstar comes from videos longer than 20 minutes, while one–third of Hotstar subscribers watch television shows. In 2019, Hotstar began investing  crore in generating original content such as "Hotstar Specials." 80% of the viewership on Hotstar comes from drama, movies and sports programs. Hotstar has the exclusive streaming rights of IPL in India, which is one of the biggest sporting event in India.

Netflix 
American streaming service Netflix entered India in January 2016. In April 2017, it was registered as a limited liability partnership (LLP) and started commissioning content. It earned a net profit of ₹2020,000 (₹2.02 million) for fiscal year 2017. In fiscal year 2018, Netflix earned revenues of ₹580 million. According to Morgan Stanley Research, Netflix had the highest average watch time of more than 120 minutes but viewer counts of around 20 million in July 2018. As of 2018, Netflix has six million subscribers, of which 5–6% are paid members.

India was not affected by Netflix's July 2018 increase in subscription rates for the US and Latin America. Netflix has stated its intent to invest ₹600 crore in the production of Indian original programming. In late 2018, Netflix bought  of office space in Bandra–Kurla Complex (BKC) in Mumbai as their head office. As of December 2018, Netflix has more than 40 employees in India.

Netflix faces tough competition with other OTT platforms in India such as Amazon Prime Video and Disney+ Hotstar, each of which charge lower subscription rates than Netflix.

Other OTT providers 

AAO NXT, the first independent OTT platform that originated from Odisha, is a flagship product of Kaustav DreamWorks. Apart from the website, they also have application for Android mobiles and TVs. The content library of AAO NXT is unique in terms of originality of the content irrespective of the language. Short films, movies, and web series can be viewed in their original language along with English subtitles.

nexGTv is the flagship product of Digivive Services Pvt Ltd. Its app offers users entertainment across multiple devices. It streams over 200 live TV channels and on-demand content, including movies, TV Shows and videos. In 2015, nexGTv launched India's first mobile talent discovery platform, called SPOTLight, with director Imtiaz Ali. In 2016 nexGTV, launched its first original series In My City with Priyanka Chopra making her mobile series debut.

Sun NXT is an Indian video on demand service run by Sun TV Network. It was launched in June 2017, streaming in Tamil language and six other Launguages. The platform has more than 4,000 Tamil movies and 200 Tamil shows, as well as regional movies and shows. Sun NXT also streams a large library of its own Sun TV shows and movies. In India Sun NXT launched its TV shows and movies also in Telugu, Malayalam, Kannada, Bengali and Marathi.

Amazon Prime Video was launched in 2016. The platform has 2,300 titles available including 2,000 movies and about 400 shows. It has announced that it will invest ₹20 billion in creating original content in India. Besides English, Prime Video is available in six Indian languages as of December 2018. Amazon India launched Amazon Prime Music in February 2018.

Neestream is a streaming media service owned by NeST Technologies Corp., which is part of the US-based JKH Holdings. It is the first OTT platform targeting the global Malayalee diaspora. In the aftermath of the COVID pandemic and the subsequent lockdown, OTT platforms had become the only avenue for film releases, redefining the movie watching experience for several viewers.

Single-language OTT sites, like Aha Video in Telugu is the first time that the platform is diversifying into another language, while CityShor.tv in Gujarati, Neestream in Malayalam, Hoichoi in Bengali and Planet Marathi in Marathi are streaming movies and shows for people in those languages.

Eros Now, an OTT platform launched by Eros International, has the most content among the OTT providers in India, including over 12,000 films, 100,000 music tracks and albums, and 100 TV shows. Eros Now was named the Best OTT Platform of the Year 2019 at the British Asian Media Awards. It has 211.5 million registered users and 36.2 million paying subscribers as of September 2020.

Apart from these, Balaji Telefilms–owned ALTBalaji and Viacom 18–owned Voot are popular because of the unique content they provide. Reliance Jio–owned JioCinema and JioTV, Times Group–owned MX Player, and Asianet Satellite Communications- owned Asianet Mobile TV are other OTT service providers in India.

Hoichoi is the first dedicated regional–language OTT service in India. It has launched 30 new shows and 12 original films in Bengali and has acquired about 200 Bengali films and dubbed content from English, Hindi and Arabic. In 2018 it entered Bangladesh as well as the United Arab Emirates, adding a prospective customer base of 180 million.

In June 2017, Sun TV Network launched their Sun NXT regional OTT service in Telugu, Tamil, Malayalam, Bengali and Kannada.

In February 2020, Aha OTT platform was launched, broadcasting exclusively Telugu content.

In 2021, Planet Marathi OTT became the first OTT platform dedicated to Marathi content in India, including web-series, films, music, theater, fiction and non-fiction reality shows. It is available for both Android and iOS mobile devices along with Android TV and Amazon Fire TV devices. Bollywood actress Madhuri Dixit helped launch the platform.

With rising interest for Korean dramas, Rakuten Viki saw its biggest jump of web traffic from India in 2020 due to COVID-19 lockdown, which lead to ad localization on the platform.

SonyLIV and ZEE5
In December 2021, Sony and Zee merged, and announced plans to merge their OTT platforms.

OTT services launched as Amazon Prime video channels

The list is by alphabetical order, not by rank or popularity.

Content and regulation 
Before 2022, OTT media content in India was largely unregulated. OTT providers were accused, especially by conservative groups, by of featuring abusive language, sexual scenes, nudity, vulgarity and hurting Hindu religious sentiments. Series which were the focus of controversy include Four More Shots Please!, Tandav, Paatal Lok, Sacred Games, and Mirzapur.
Pornographic films are illegal in India, and several websites and over-the-top media services in India were also closed down by the Cyber Crime Branch for streaming pornographic content on their platform.

In 2022, the Government of India came out with new regulations for streaming platforms. The creators of these series voiced concerns that these regulations constituted censorship.

List of OTT platforms in India

The list is by alphabetical order, not by rank or popularity.

List of podcast platforms in India

References

Broadcasting in India
OTT in India